This is a list of notable players for FC Dynamo Moscow. It includes the players who made at least 50 league appearances for the club or scored at least 5 league goals.

Figures and dates are for the league competitions only (Soviet Top League and Russian Premier League). Appearances and goals in the games which were awarded to one team after the fact (or in the unfinished 1941 Soviet Top League) are included.

For a list of all Dynamo players with a Wikipedia article, see :Category:FC Dynamo Moscow players.

Players

First-choice line-ups
This section lists 11 players that played the most games in each season (the goalkeeper who played the most games in a season among goalkeepers is included even if he is not in the top eleven players for that season among all positions).

 
Dynamo Moscow players
FC Dynamo
FC Dynamo
Association football player non-biographical articles